Tomáš Kott (born 15 November 1999) is a Czech professional football midfielder currently playing for FC Slovan Velvary in the Bohemian Football League B.

He made his league debut for Dukla Prague on 29 September 2018 in their 1–1 home draw against Zlín.

References

External links 

 
 
 Tomáš Kott profile on the FK Dukla Prague official website

1999 births
Living people
Czech footballers
Association football midfielders
FK Dukla Prague players
Czech First League players
Czech National Football League players
Bohemian Football League players